The VTB United League 2012–13 was the fourth complete season of the VTB United League, which is Northern and Eastern Europe's top-tier level men's professional club basketball competition. The tournament featured 20 teams, from 10 countries. CSKA Moscow won its 4th VTB title, by beating Lokomotiv-Kuban Krasnodar, 3–1, in a best-of-five Finals series.

Participants

Regular season

Group A

Group B

Playoffs

Round of 16
The teams that finished third, fourth, fifth and sixth in the other group in a Best-Of-3 series.

|}

Quarterfinals
The teams that finished first and two in the other group battled with 1/8 final winners in a Best-Of-5 series.

|}

Semifinals
The teams that won in 1/4 final, battled with other 1/4 final winner in a Best-Of-5 series.

|}

Final
The teams that won in 1/2 final, battled with other 1/2 final winner in a Best-Of-5 series.

|}

Rosters 
 Champion: Miloš Teodosić, Vladimir Micov, Aleksandr Gudumak, Aaron Jackson, Dmitry Sokolov, Nenad Krstić, Sonny Weems, Aleksei Zozulin, Zoran Erceg, Evgeny Voronov, Andrey Vorontsevich, Sasha Kaun, Victor Khryapa, Anton Ponkrashov, Theo Papaloukas (Coach: Ettore Messina)
Top efficiency: Victor Khryapa, 15.0 EFF
Top scorer: Sonny Weems, 11.0 PPG
Top rebounder: Victor Khryapa, 7.0 RPG
Top assister: Victor Khryapa, 4.3 APG

 Runner-up: Maxim Grigoryev, Derrick Brown, Richard Hendrix, Alexey Savrasenko, Mantas Kalnietis, Sergey Bykov, Valeriy Likhodey, Simas Jasaitis, James Baron, Andrey Zubkov, Aleks Marić, Nick Calathes, Maksym Sheleketo (Coach: Evgeniy Pashutin)
Top efficiency: Nick Calathes, 16.1 EFF
Top scorer: Nick Calathes, 13.9 PPG
Top rebounder: Aleks Marić, 6.6 RPG
Top assister: Nick Calathes, 6.1 APG

Awards
Most Valuable Player:  E. J. Rowland (VEF Riga)
Playoffs MVP:  Victor Khryapa (CSKA Moscow)
Young Player of the Year:  Sergey Karasev (Triumph Lyubertsy)

Nationality awards
For the first time, awards were handed out to the best player by nationality.

Monthly MVP

References

External links 
Official Website 
Official Website 

2012-13
2012–13 in European basketball leagues
2012–13 in Russian basketball
2012–13 in Lithuanian basketball
2012–13 in Ukrainian basketball
2012–13 in Latvian basketball
2012–13 in Estonian basketball
2012–13 in Polish basketball
2012–13 in Belarusian basketball
2012–13 in Kazakhstani basketball
2012–13 in Czech basketball